Omalodini is a small tribe of clown beetles in the family Histeridae. There are at least 2 genera and more than 60 described species in Omalodini.

Genera
These two genera belong to the tribe Omalodini:
 Ebonius Lewis, 1885
 Omalodes Erichson, 1834

References

Further reading

 

Histeridae
Polyphaga tribes